Arnold Deutsch (1903–1942?), variously described as Austrian, Czech or Hungarian, was an academic who worked in London as a Soviet spy, best known for having recruited Kim Philby. Much of his life remains unknown or disputed.

Early life
He was a cousin of Oscar Deutsch, the proprietor of the Odeon Cinemas chain. Though he claimed to be an observant Jew to disguise his role as a Communist agent, Deutsch was in fact lapsed in his religious beliefs.

At the age of 24, Deutsch received with distinction his PhD in chemistry from the University of Vienna. He was also a follower of Wilhelm Reich and his "sex-pol" movement.

Espionage career
At the same time, Deutsch embarked on his lifelong involvement with Communism and the Soviet Union. In the 1920s he was working for the OMS, the International Liaison Department of the Comintern. A co-worker of his there was Edith Suschitzky, whom he met at 1926 in Vienna and who would be instrumental in his later espionage career.

Soon after leaving university he married an Austrian woman, Josefine. The couple were both recruited by the Comintern and worked for OMS, its international liaison department. Over the next couple of years they travelled around the world working as couriers.

In 1933, Deutsch was arrested by the Nazi authorities in Germany, but was freed from custody with the help of Willi Lehmann, the highly placed Soviet agent within the Gestapo.

Deutsch then travelled to Britain under his real name, so that his university credentials would be valid. Upon arriving in England, Deutsch studied psychology at the graduate level at the University of London, as his cover for espionage work in England.

In the mid-1930s Deutsch occupied Flat 7 of the Isokon building in Lawn Road, Hampstead, north London.

The writer Nigel West (Rupert Allason) asserts, based on the information provided in 1940 by Soviet defector Walter Krivitsky, that Deutsch had been an assistant of the Latvian-born senior Soviet spy Adam Purpis, who according to the same source was between 1931 and 1934 the NKVD Illegal Rezident (i.e. agent operating outside the embassy) in the UK.

Deutsch's legacy from his time in the UK is to have come up with a highly successful agent recruitment strategy. Deutsch observed that the high quantity of Communist students and constant turnover due to matriculation and graduation provided an excellent recruiting ground. The idea was to select capable, idealistic students and have them publicly distance themselves from Communism so that they could penetrate the British government and intelligence spheres. The students' former involvement in Communism would be overlooked by the British as a mere youthful mistake. This strategy produced many well-placed agents, especially the Cambridge Five, the first of which was Kim Philby, whom Deutsch recruited directly.

When Litzi Friedmann and Kim Philby, who had just married in Vienna, arrived in London from Vienna in 1934, Edith Suschitzky suggested to Deutsch that the NKVD should recruit Friedmann and Philby as agents. Deutsch recruited Kim Philby in Regent's Park, London, on 1 July 1934.

Deutsch told Philby that he must break-off all communist contacts. He should establish a new political image as a Nazi-sympathiser. "He must become, to all outward appearances, a conventional member of the very class he was committed to opposing." Deutsch told him. "The anti-fascist movement needs people who can enter into the bourgeoisie." Deutsch gave him a new Minox subminiature camera and gave him a codename (Sohnchen). He began to instruct Philby on the rudiments of tradecraft: how to arrange a meeting; where to leave messages; how to detect if his telephone was bugged; how to spot a tail, and how to lose one. His first task was to spy on his father, Harry St John Bridger Philby, as it was believed he had important secret documents in his office.

Deutsch then went on to recruit Donald Maclean and Guy Burgess in 1934. Using the code name Otto, Deutsch was the controller for the Cambridge Five spy ring from 1933 to 1937, when he was replaced by Theodore Maly. Whilst in London, Deutsch also acted as handler for Percy Glading, who was operating a spy ring within Woolwich Arsenal, which obtained blueprints of Britain's brand new—and highly secret—naval gun.

During his time in the United Kingdom, Deutsch was given the task of evaluating an American recruit, Michael Straight, who did not impress him. Deutsch's evaluation of Straight was to be borne out almost thirty years later, in 1963, when Straight decided to voluntarily inform Arthur Schlesinger, Jr., a family friend, about his communist connections from his student days at Cambridge University, a confession which led directly to the exposure of Anthony Blunt as a recruiter and member of the Cambridge Five spy ring.

In September 1937, in the midst of Joseph Stalin's fatal purges in the Moscow show trials, Deutsch was recalled to Moscow. At that time, Deutsch was at great risk of being discovered in western Europe, because of the defections of the highly placed Soviet operatives Ignace Reiss and Walter Krivitsky; he had been familiar with some elements of their operations.

Back in Moscow, Deutsch was extensively debriefed, and managed to escape execution – which, at the time, was the fate of many completely loyal Communists.

Fate unknown
Deutsch's final fate is uncertain. Among theories which have been proposed by various authors, Deutsch was said to have been captured and shot by the Nazis after parachuting into Austria; or as having drowned when his ship was sunk by a U-boat while en route to New York, where he was supposed to work with NKVD recruits.

Kim Philby's fourth and last wife, Rufina, cites the drowning story, but says that the Russian sources are divided on where Deutsch was headed when his ship, the Donbass, was sunk on its way to the United States. She says that Volume 3 of the KGB History states that Deutsch's eventual destination was Latin America, but then says that Allen Weinstein and Alexander Vasilliev, citing KGB files, write, in Haunted Wood, that Deutsch was headed to the New York residency to expand its operations.

Portrayal in fiction
In the 2003 four-part BBC television drama about the Cambridge Spies, Deutsch was portrayed in the first two episodes by Marcel Iures.

References

1903 births
1942 deaths
Alumni of the University of London
Austrian spies for the Soviet Union
Austrian Jews
Soviet spies
University of Vienna alumni
Austrian emigrants to the Soviet Union
NKVD officers
Austrian civilians killed in World War II
Deaths due to shipwreck at sea